Koyippillil Madan Mohan (12 February 1945 – 8 January 2020) was an Indian cricketer who played in thirty-two first-class matches for Kerala between 1961 and 1971.

References

External links
 

1945 births
2020 deaths
Indian cricketers
Kerala cricketers
Place of birth missing